The 2012 County Championship season, known as the LV= County Championship for sponsorship reasons, was the 113th cricket County Championship season. Warwickshire won their seventh County Championship title. It was contested through two divisions: Division One and Division Two. Each team plays all the others in their division both home and away. The top two teams from Division Two (Derbyshire and Yorkshire) were promoted to the first division for the 2013 season, while the bottom two sides from Division One (Worcestershire and defending champions Lancashire) were relegated.

Teams

Division One
 Team promoted from Division Two

Division Two
 Team relegated from Division One

Standings
 Pld = Played, W = Wins, L = Losses, D = Draws, T = Ties, A = Abandonments, Bat = Batting points, Bowl = Bowling points, Ded = Deducted points, Pts = Points.

Teams receive 16 points for a win and 3 for a draw. Bonus points (a maximum of 5 batting points and 3 bowling points) may be scored during the first 110 overs of each team's first innings.

Division One

Division Two

Results summary
The fixtures for 2012 were announced in November 2011.

Division One

Division Two

Results in full

Division One

April

May

June

July

August

September

Division Two

April

May

June

July

August

September

Statistics

Division One

Most runs

References

County Championship seasons
2012 in English cricket